Novosemyonovka is a rural locality (a village) in Tashlinsky Selsoviet, Gafuriysky District, Bashkortostan, Russia. The population was 14 as of 2010. There is 1 street.

Geography 
Novosemyonovka is located 23 km northeast of Krasnousolsky (the district's administrative centre) by road. Novaya Aldashla is the nearest rural locality.

References 

Rural localities in Gafuriysky District